Ningming County is a county in southwestern Guangxi, China. It is famous for being home to the Hua mountain rock paintings World Heritage Site. A diverse range of languages and dialects are spoken alongside Mandarin Chinese, including local Yue Chinese called Pak Va (白话), Zuojiang Zhuang. It is under the administration of the prefecture-level city of Chongzuo and borders Vietnam's provinces of Lạng Sơn and Quảng Ninh.

Administrative divisions
There are 4 towns and 9 townships in the county:

Towns:
 Chengzhong (城中镇) Literally 'city county' known as Ningming (宁明) by locals, Aidian (爱店镇), Mingjiang (明江镇), Haiyuan (海渊镇)

Townships:
Tingliang Township (亭亮乡), Zhai'an Township (寨安乡), Zhilang Township (峙浪乡), Dong'an Township (东安乡), Bangun Township (板棍乡), Beijiang Township (北江乡), Tongmian Township (桐棉乡), Nakan Township (那堪乡), Nanan Township (那楠乡)

Climate

References

External links

 Street view video Ningming

Counties of Guangxi
Chongzuo